R151 road may refer to:
 R151 road (Ireland)
 R151 (Bangladesh)